The Grady Gammage Memorial Auditorium is a multipurpose performing arts center at 1200 South Forest Avenue at East Apache Boulevard in Tempe, Arizona, within the main campus of Arizona State University (ASU). The auditorium, which bears the name of former ASU President Grady Gammage, is considered to be one of the last public commissions of American architect Frank Lloyd Wright.  It was built from 1962 to 1964.

The Gammage stands as one of the largest exhibitors of performing arts among university venues in the world, featuring a wide range of genres and events.

The Auditorium was listed on the National Register of Historic Places in 1985.

History
The process that led to construction of the Gammage Memorial Auditorium began in 1957 when incumbent ASU President Grady Gammage desired a unique auditorium for the ASU campus. In 1956, a collapsed roof rendered a campus facility that served as an auditorium and gymnasium unusable. Gammage recruited his friend Frank Lloyd Wright to design the new auditorium. He would, with various budget related alterations, base its design on an opera house that he had conceptualized for the city of Baghdad, Iraq sometime prior upon the invitation of King Faisal II. Plans for the Baghdad opera house were abandoned after the King's assassination in the 14 July Revolution. Wright is also said to be responsible for the 1200 South Forest Avenue location of the circular auditorium, a site which was then occupied by an athletic field, and earlier by G.I. housing units. Wright and Gammage both died in 1959, leaving Wright's protégé William Wesley Peters to undertake completion of the auditorium. Spearheaded by the Robert E. McKee Company, construction of the facility commenced in 1962 and completed twenty-five months later, officially opening on September 18, 1964, in time to host The Philadelphia Orchestra conducted by Eugene Ormandy.

The auditorium was used for the funeral of Arizona Senator and 1964 Republican presidential nominee Barry Goldwater on June 3, 1998.

On October 13, 2004, the auditorium was the site of the third and closing debate between George W. Bush and John Kerry in the 2004 U.S. Presidential Election.

Structure
Fifty concrete columns support the round roof with its pattern of interlocking circles. Twin "flying buttress" pedestrian ramps extending  from the north and east sides of the structure connect the building to the parking lot. The auditorium seats 3,017 people on its main floor, grand tier and balcony. The stage can be adapted for grand opera, Broadway musicals, dramatic productions, solo productions, organ recitals and lectures.

Performance and other spaces

Auditorium

The auditorium has a maximum seating capacity of 3,017. It is wheelchair accessible and has an infrared system for 100 hearing-impaired people (in addition to signers).

Stage
 Stage type: proscenium
 Playing space dimensions: 64'x33' or 64'x40'
 Proscenium opening: 64'x30'
 Height grid/ceiling: 78'
 Stage floor type: Canadian hard rock maple
 Rigging system type: 58 double purchase, 40 hydraulic (98 lines total)

Backstage
 Loading dock
 Door dimensions: 10'x11'6''
 Dressing rooms: 9
 Maximum capacity: 54

Deck

Permanent installations: traps in stage, orchestra shell, hydraulic orchestra pit, electricity in pit, music stands, pianos
Pit
 Dimensions: 76'x9'
 Number of stands: 85
 Chairs for pit: 90

Electrics/Sound
 Building electrics current: 9 panels-3-600/3-200/2-100/1-100 = 2700 total
 Lighting board: computer memory
 Lighting equipment: 32-8x13, 22-10x12, 55-6x9, 30 8" Fresnels, 12 Par Cans, 12 Mini Strips

See also
 Broadway Across America

References
Notes

Bibliography
 Storrer, William Allin. The Frank Lloyd Wright Companion. University of Chicago Press, 2006,  (S.432)

External links

 ASU Gammage
 Page with photos of the Gammage Auditorium
 Gammage Auditorium on waymarking.com
 Gammage Auditorium on peterbeers.net
 Lion King at ASU Gammage
 Photos on Arcaid

Frank Lloyd Wright buildings
Arizona State University buildings
Concert halls in Arizona
Performing arts centers in Arizona
Theatres on the National Register of Historic Places in Arizona
Buildings and structures in Tempe, Arizona
Tourist attractions in Tempe, Arizona
National Register of Historic Places in Pima County, Arizona